The 1994–95 Slovenian Third League was the third season of the Slovenian Third League, the third highest level in the Slovenian football system.

League standings

East

West

See also
1994–95 Slovenian Second League

References

External links
Football Association of Slovenia 

Slovenian Third League seasons
3
Slovenia